O'Malley is an Irish surname.

People
 Maille mac Conall of Umhaill
 Mary Ní Mháille (died 1525)
 Brian O'Malley (director), Irish film and television director
 Bryan Lee O'Malley (born 1979), comic book creator
 Conner O'Malley, American comedian 
 Daragh O'Malley (born 1954), Irish actor
 Desmond O'Malley (1939–2021), Irish politician
 Donogh O'Malley (1921–1968), Irish Fianna Fáil politician
 Edward O'Malley (disambiguation)
 Sir Edward Loughlin O'Malley (1842–1932), British lawyer, judge and unsuccessful political candidate
 Edward R. O'Malley (1863–1935), American lawyer, politician and judge
 Ed O'Malley, American American non-profit executive, author and politician
 Edwin Joseph O'Malley (1881–1955), Commissioner of Public Markets for New York City
 Ernie O'Malley (1897–1957), Irish Republican Army officer
 Fiona O'Malley (born 1968), Irish Progressive Democrat politician
 Grace O'Malley (c. 1530 – c. 1603), Irish noblewoman and chieftainess
 Henry O'Malley (1876–1936), American fish culturist, United States Commissioner of Fisheries (1922–1933)
 Jack O'Malley (Michigan politician), American politician
 Joan O'Malley, Canadian civil servant
 Joe O'Malley (1932–2015), American football player
 John O'Malley (1878–1940), American politician
 John F. O'Malley, American architect
 John J. O'Malley, American architect
 John na Seoltadh Ó Máille (fl.1568), lord 
 J. Pat O'Malley (1904–1985), English singer and actor
 Kate O'Malley (disambiguation)
 Kate O'Malley, a British actress active in the 1990s who was a regular on the last two seasons of Soldier Soldier
 Kathleen M. O'Malley (born 1956), United States federal judge
 Katie O'Malley (born 1962), Maryland state court judge, and first lady of Maryland
 King O'Malley (1858–1953), Australian politician
 Mart O'Malley (1890–1972), Indiana state judge
 Martin O'Malley (born 1963), American politician
 Martin O'Malley (journalist) (born 1939), Canadian journalist
 Mary O'Malley (disambiguation), various including
 Mary O'Malley (author), American author and public speaker
 Mary O'Malley (director) (1918–2006), Irish director
 Mary O'Malley (playwright) (born 1941), English playwright
 Mary O'Malley (poet) (born 1954), Irish poet
 Matthew V. O'Malley (1878–1931), American politician
 Mick O'Malley (born 1972), Australian boxer of the 1990s and 2000s 
 Mike O'Malley (born 1969), American actor
 Nick O'Malley (born 1985), indie-rock musician
 Sir Owen O'Malley (1887–1974), British diplomat
 Pamela O'Malley (1929–2006), Irish-Spanish bohemian, educationalist and radical
 Patrick O'Malley (disambiguation) or Pat O'Malley, various including
 Patrick O'Malley (American politician) (born 1950), former Illinois State Senator
 Patrick O'Malley (Irish politician) (born 1943), Irish Progressive Democrats politician
 Padraig O'Malley (born 1942), Irish-American academic
 Pádraic Ó Máille (1878–1946), Irish politician
 Pat O'Malley (actor) (1890–1966), American actor
 Peter O'Malley (disambiguation)
 Peter O'Malley (born 1937), American baseball executive
 Peter O'Malley (cricketer) (1927-1957), New Zealand cricketer
 Peter O'Malley (footballer), New Zealand international football (soccer) player
 Peter O'Malley (golfer) (born 1965), Australian golfer
 Robert Emmett O'Malley (born 1943), Medal of Honor recipient
 Rory O'Malley (born 1980), Broadway actor
 Ryan O'Malley (born 1980), American baseball player
 Ryan O'Malley (American football) (born 1993), American football player
 Séamus O'Malley (1903–2002), Irish Gaelic football player
 Seán Patrick O'Malley (born 1944), Roman Catholic Cardinal
 Sean O'Malley (fighter) (born 1994), American mixed martial artist
 Stephen O'Malley (born 1974), American musician/guitarist, producer, composer, and visual artist
 Susan O'Malley, American sports executive
 Susan O'Malley (artist) (1976–2015), public art, author and museum curator
 T. J. O'Malley (1915–2009), American aerospace engineer
 Thomas O'Malley (disambiguation)
 Thomas O'Malley (congressman) (1903–1979), U.S. Representative from Wisconsin
 Thomas O'Malley (writer), Irish writer
 Thomas Francis O'Malley (1889-1954), American politician
 Thomas J. O'Malley (1868–1936), American politician, lieutenant governor of Wisconsin
 Thomas P. O'Malley (1930–2009), American Jesuit and academic
 Tim O'Malley (politician) (born 1944), Irish politician 
 Tim O'Malley (rugby union) (born 1994), New Zealand rugby union player 
 Tim O'Malley (actor), author of Godshow
 Tom O'Malley (born 1960), former American Major League Baseball player
 Tom O'Malley (American football) (1925–2011), American football player
 Tony O'Malley (1913–2003), Irish painter
 Tuthal Ó Máille (fl.1413], Gaelic-Irish lord 
 Walter O'Malley (1903–1979), owner of the Brooklyn/Los Angeles Dodgers baseball team
 William O'Malley (disambiguation)
 William O'Malley (politician) (1853–1939), MP for Connemara, Ireland, 1906
 William O'Malley (Jesuit) (born 1931), American Jesuit priest, teacher, and author
 Zack O'Malley Greenburg (born 1985), American writer, journalist, and former child-actor

See also 
 :Category:O'Malley family
 O'Malley (disambiguation)

Fictional characters 
 Mr. O'Malley, comic strip fairy-godfather
 Conor O'Malley, in dark fantasy drama film "A Monster Calls", directed by J. A. Bayona and written by Patrick Ness
 Emily Napoli O'Malley, fictional character from the video game series, Delicious
 O'Malley, a fictional character in the machinima series Red vs. Blue
 Abraham de Lacy Giuseppe Casey Thomas O'Malley, from the 1970 Disney animated film The Aristocats
 George O'Malley, from  Grey's Anatomy
 Father Charles "Chuck" O'Malley, from the films Going My Way and The Bells of St. Mary, and the TV series Going My Way
 Nellie O'Malley, from American Girl's Samantha sub-series
 Sally O'Malley, a recurring character on Saturday Night Live

External links
 O'Malley Clan Association at OMalleyClan.ie

Anglicised Irish-language surnames